The 1965 Kansas State Wildcats football team represented Kansas State University in the 1965 NCAA University Division football season.  The team's head football coach was Doug Weaver.  The Wildcats played their home games in Memorial Stadium.  1965 saw the Wildcats finish with a record of 0–10, and a 0–7 record in Big Eight Conference play.  The Wildcats score only 43 points while giving up 296. The finished eight in the Big Eight.

Schedule

References

Kansas State
Kansas State Wildcats football seasons
College football winless seasons
Kansas State Wildcats football